An election to Dublin City Council took place on 11 June 2004 as part of that year's Irish local elections. 52 councillors were elected from thirteen electoral divisions by PR-STV voting for a five-year term of office.

Results by party

Results by Electoral Area

Artane

Ballyfermot

Ballymun-Whitehall

Cabra-Glasnevin

Clontarf

Crumlin-Kimmage

Donaghmede

Finglas

North Inner City

Pembroke

Rathmines

South-East Inner City

South-West Inner City

External links
 Voting data
 Old Local Election Results
 Council Results

2004 Irish local elections
2004
2000s in Dublin (city)
2004 elections in the Republic of Ireland
June 2004 events in Europe